The 2003–04 Illinois Fighting Illini men's basketball team represented 98th season University of Illinois at Urbana-Champaign in the 2003-04 NCAA Division I men's basketball season.  This was head coach Bruce Weber's first season at Illinois.

Season
Bill Self left the Fighting Illini in March, 2003 to take over as coach at Kansas, paving the way for Bruce Weber to be named the 16th Illinois head coach on April 30, 2003. Weber arrived in Champaign after directing the Southern Illinois Salukis for five seasons. Weber’s inaugural season directing the Orange and Blue was a success, as he became just the third coach in Big Ten history to win an outright conference championship in his first season. The Illini had to win its final 10 games of the regular season to clinch sole possession of the title, with six of those wins coming away from the Assembly Hall. Weber also guided Illinois to its first NCAA Tournament victory over a higher seeded team, when the No. 5 Illini defeated No. 4 Cincinnati in the second round of the tournament. The Illini finished the year with a record of 26-7 and advanced to the NCAA Sweet Sixteen.

Roster

Schedule

|-
!colspan=12 style="background:#DF4E38; color:white;"| Exhibition

|-
!colspan=12 style="background:#DF4E38; color:white;"| Non-Conference regular season

|-
!colspan=9 style="background:#DF4E38; color:#FFFFFF;"|Big Ten regular season

|-
!colspan=9 style="text-align: center; background:#DF4E38"|Big Ten tournament

|-
!colspan=9 style="text-align: center; background:#DF4E38"|NCAA tournament

Season Statistics

Awards and honors
Dee Brown 
Associated Press Honorable Mention All-American 
Deron Williams
Team Most Valuable Player

Team players drafted into the NBA

Rankings

References

Illinois Fighting Illini
Illinois Fighting Illini men's basketball seasons
Illinois
Illinois
Illinois